Top Model, cycle 7 is the seventh cycle of an ongoing reality television series based on Tyra Banks' America's Next Top Model that pits contestants from Poland against each other in a variety of competitions to determine who will win the title of the next Polish Top Model.

Joanna Krupa, who also serves as the lead judge, returned to host the seventh cycle. Other judges included fashion designer Dawid Woliński, fashion show director Kasia Sokołowska and photographer Marcin Tyszka. This is the fourth season of the show to feature male contestants.

Among the prizes for the season are a contract with D'vision Model Management, an appearance on the cover of the Polish issue of Glamour, 100,000 złotys (US$30,000) and a campaign for About You.

The international destinations this cycle were Sölden, Los Angeles, Antananarivo and Hamburg.

Contestants 
(Ages stated are at start of contest)

Safe:
Oliwia Zasada

Not Safe:
Ange-Sophie Reich
Anna Markowska
Daria Dąbrowska
Franciszek Strąkowski
Hubert Gromadzki
Julia Frankowicz
Kasia Szklarczyk
Magdalena Przybielska
Michał Borzuchowski
Natalia Gorączka
Piotr Muszyński
Szymon Reich
Żaklina Ta Dinh

Episodes

Episode 1
Original airdate: 

Auditions for the seventh season of Top Model begin, and aspiring hopefuls are chosen for the semi-final round.

Episode 2
Original airdate: 

In the semi-finals, the judges begin to eliminate contestants to narrow the number of models who will battle it out for a place in the final fourteen.

Episode 3
Original airdate: 

In the third and final casting episode of the season, the judges choose the finalists who will move onto the main competition out of the remaining pool of contestants.

Names in bold represent eliminated semi-finalists

Episode 4
Original airdate: 

Challenge winner: Ania Markowska
Immune from elimination: Ania Markowska, Kasia Szklarczyk, Magda Przybielska, Michał Borzuchowski, Oliwia Zasada, Piotr Muszyński & Żaklina Ta Dinh
First call-out: Oliwia Zasada
Bottom three: Franek Strąkowski, Julia Frankowicz & Natalia Gorączka
Eliminated: Julia Frankowicz
Featured photographers: Adam Pluciński, Jacek Kołodziejski
Special guests: Małgorzata Rozenek-Majdan
Guest judge: Robert Biedroń

Episode 5
Original airdate: 

Challenge winner: Kasia Szklarczyk
First call-out: Daria Dąbrowska
Bottom three: Franek Strąkowski, Oliwia Zasada & Natalia Gorączka
Eliminated: Natalia Gorączka
Featured photographer: Sonia Szóstak
Special guests: Ewa Grzelakowska-Kostoglu, Maria Konarowska, Michał Mikołajczak
Guest judge: Anja Rubik

Episode 6
Original airdate: 

Challenge winners: Magda Przybielska & Hubert Gromadzki
First call-out: Magda Przybielska
Bottom three: Ange-Sophie Reich, Franek Strąkowski & Oliwia Zasada
Eliminated: Ange-Sophie Reich & Franek Strąkowski
Featured photographer: Rafał Makieła
Special guests: Jakob Kosel
Guest judge: Zuzanna Bijoch & Mariusz Przybylski

Episode 7
Original airdate: 

Challenge winner: Daria Dąbrowska, Oliwia Zasada & Szymon Reich 
Immune from elimination: Daria Dąbrowska & Hubert Gromadzki, Kasia Szklarczyk, Oliwia Zasada & Piotr Muszyński
First call-out: Daria Dąbrowska & Hubert Gromadzki
Bottom three: Ania Markowska, Szymon Reich & Żaklina Ta Dinh
Originally eliminated: Żaklina Ta Dinh
Featured photographer: Piet Truhlar
Special guests: Julia Wieniawa & Paweł Księżopolski
Guest judge: Anna Jurgaś & Sasha Knezevic

Episode 8
Original airdate: 

Challenge winner: Kasia Szklarczyk, Hubert Gromadzki & Ania Markowska
Immune from elimination: Kasia Szklarczyk
First call-out: Oliwia Zasada
Bottom three: Piotr Muszyński, Magda Przybielska & Żaklina Ta Dinh
Eliminated: Żaklina Ta Dinh
Featured photographer: Adam Pluciński 
Special guests: Michał Baryza, Osi Ugonoh & Daniel Tracz
Guest judge: Marta Dyks

Episode 9
Original airdate: 

First challenge winner: Kasia Szklarczyk
Second challenge winner: Oliwia Zasada
First call-out: Daria Dąbrowska
Bottom three: Kasia Szklarczyk, Oliwia Zasada & Piotr Muszyński
Eliminated: Piotr Muszyński
Featured photographer: Łukasz Pęcak
Featured director: Monika Kmita
Special guests: Valentina Lozovskaya, Stefano Sala, Veronique Droulez, Maja Salamon, Pat Boguławski, Karolina Gruszecka, Patryk Bogusławski
Guest judge: Filip Niedenthal

Episode 10
Original airdate: 

Challenge winner: Magda Przybielska
First call-out: Ania Markowska
Bottom three: Daria Dąbrowska, Oliwia Zasada & Szymon Reich
Eliminated: Oliwia Zasada & Szymon Reich
Featured photographer: Marcin Tyszka
Special guests: Joanna Przetakiewicz
Guest judge: Joanna Przetakiewicz

Episode 11
Original airdate: 

Challenge winner: Kasia Szklarczyk & Michał Borzuchowski 
First call-out: Hubert Gromadzki
Bottom three: Ania Markowska, Kasia Szklarczyk & Daria Dąbrowska
Eliminated: Daria Dąbrowska
Featured photographer: Art Brewer
Guest judge: Erik Rosete

Episode 12
Original airdate: 

First call-out: Kasia Szklarczyk
Bottom three: Ania Markowska, Magda Przybielska & Michał Borzuchowski
Eliminated: Magda Przybielska & Michał Borzuchowski
Featured photographer: Jack Guy
Guest judge: Walter Mendez & Ryan Patros

Episode 13
Original airdate: 

Final three: Ania Markowska, Hubert Gromadzki & Kasia Szklarczyk
Eliminated: Ania Markowska
Final two: Hubert Gromadzki & Kasia Szklarczyk
Poland's Next Top Model: Kasia Szklarczyk
Featured photographer: Gosia Turczyńska, Iza Grzybowska, Magnus Lechner
Guest judge: Anja Rubik

Results 

 The contestant was immune from elimination
 The contestant was eliminated
 The contestant was originally eliminated but was saved.
 The contestant won the competition

Bottom Two/Three 

 The contestant was eliminated after their first time in the bottom two
 The contestant was eliminated after their second time in the bottom two
 The contestant was eliminated after their third time in the bottom two
 The contestant was eliminated after their fourth time in the bottom two
 The contestant was eliminated in the final judging and placed third.
 The contestant was eliminated in the final judging and placed second.

Photo shoot guide
Episode 3 photo shoot: Group shots (semifinals) 
Episode 4 photo shoot: 7 Sins of the modern world
Episode 5 photo shoot: Nude in a garden
Episode 6 photo shoot: Posing underwater
Episode 7 photo shoot: Spy agents on the Central Alps
Episode 8 photo shoot: Baroque party madness
Episode 9 motion shoot: Fashion film for Vogue Polska
Episode 10 photo shoots: Posing topless covered in powder; natural beauty portraits
Episode 11 photo shoot: Venice beach editorial
Episode 12 photo shoot: Los Angeles desert couture
Episode 13 photo shoots: Glamour covers, Apart Jewelry campaign, About you

Ratings

References

 

Top Model (Polish TV series)
2018 in Polish television